The 2013 Canadian Open of Curling was held from November 13 to 17 at Medicine Hat Arena in Medicine Hat, Alberta as part of the 2013–14 World Curling Tour. The event was the second men's Grand Slam event of the season. The event was held in a round robin format, and the purse for the event was CAD$100,000.

Teams
The teams are listed as follows:

Round-robin standings
Final round-robin standings

Round-robin results
All draw times are listed in Mountain Standard Time (UTC−7).

Draw 1
Wednesday, November 13, 7:00 pm

Draw 2
Thursday, November 14, 10:00 am

Draw 3
Thursday, November 14, 1:30 pm

Draw 4
Thursday, November 14, 5:30 pm

Draw 5
Thursday, November 14, 8:30 pm

Draw 6
Friday, November 15, 10:00am

Draw 7
Friday, November 15, 1:30 pm

Draw 8
Friday, November 15, 5:00 pm

Draw 9
Friday, November 15, 8:30 pm

Tiebreakers
Saturday, November 16, 10:00 am

Playoffs

Quarterfinals
Saturday, November 16, 10:00 am

Saturday, November 16, 3:00 pm

Semifinals
Saturday, November 16, 6:30pm

Final
Sunday, November 17, 11:00am

References

 http://www.thegrandslamofcurling.com/curling/canadianopen/canadian-open-schedule-2013/

External links

2013
Canadian Open of Curling, 2013
Sport in Medicine Hat
Canadian Open of Curling, 2013
Canadian Open of Curling
Canadian Open of Curling, 2013